Jos van Nieuwstadt (born 19 November 1979) is a Dutch former professional footballer who played as a centre-back.

Career
Previously he played for SC Cambuur after his contract with Doncaster Rovers was terminated by mutual consent on 31 August 2009. At Doncaster he scored once against Reading in 16 league appearances. Despite putting in a number of solid displays for Doncaster, he struggled to hold down a regular starting place with the Yorkshire side. Aside from Doncaster Rovers his other former clubs include Willem II and Excelsior. He also played for HSV Hoek in 2010.

He has also been capped one time in the UEFA Champions League group stage. On 26 October 1999, against Spartak Moscow, Van Nieuwstadt made his UEFA Champions League debut with Willem II.

References

External links
Jos van Nieuwstadt player profile at doncasterroversfc.co.uk

1979 births
Living people
People from Waalwijk
Dutch footballers
Association football central defenders
Eredivisie players
Eerste Divisie players
Derde Divisie players
English Football League players
Willem II (football club) players
Excelsior Rotterdam players
Doncaster Rovers F.C. players
HSV Hoek players
FC Lienden players
VV Capelle players
Dutch expatriate footballers
Dutch expatriate sportspeople in England
Expatriate footballers in England
Footballers from North Brabant